Leland is an unincorporated community in the town of Honey Creek, Sauk County, Wisconsin, United States.

The community was named for Cyrus Leland, who built a sawmill around which the settlement coalesced.

Photos

References

Unincorporated communities in Sauk County, Wisconsin
Unincorporated communities in Wisconsin